Lipnica Dolna  is a village in the administrative district of Gmina Lipnica Murowana, within Bochnia County, Lesser Poland Voivodeship, in southern Poland.

The village has a population of 1,100.

Its main tourist attraction is the St. Leonard Church from 15th century, part of the UNESCO monument, the Wooden churches of Southern Lesser Poland.

References

Villages in Bochnia County